Honky's Ladder is an extended play single by the band The Afghan Whigs.

Track listing
 "Honky's Ladder"
 "Blame, Etc."
 "If I Only Had a Heart" (From The Wizard of Oz)
 "Creep"

References

External links
Single track listing on the Summer's Kiss website

The Afghan Whigs albums
1996 EPs
Mute Records EPs